St. John Chrysostom Church is a Catholic church in Novokuznetsk in Russia.

See also
 Catholic Church in Russia
 St. John Chrysostom Church

References

buildings and structures in Kemerovo Oblast
churches in Siberia
Novokuznetsk
Roman Catholic churches in Russia